Glyphostoma oliverai is a species of sea snail, a marine gastropod mollusk in the family Clathurellidae.

Description

Distribution

References

 Bouchet, P.; Fontaine, B. (2009). List of new marine species described between 2002-2006. Census of Marine Life

oliverai
Gastropods described in 2004